Bernardo Élis Fleury de Campos Curado (15 November 1915 – 30 November 1997) was a Brazilian lawyer, professor, poet, short story writer and novelist. He was the son of the poet Érico José Curado and Marieta Fleury Curado. He studied law and worked as a public servant and teacher.

He wrote his first short story at the age of 12, inspired by a piece by Afonso Arinos. In 1942, he moved to Rio de Janeiro with the intention of settling there. He brought a book of poetry and another of short stories, which he intended to publish. Without realizing his intention, he returned to Goiás. He founded the magazine Oeste and published the short story "Nhola dos Anjos ea Corumbá". In 1944, his book of short stories Ermos e gerais was published to widespread critical praise. That same year he married the poet Violeta Metran

In 1945, he participated in the 1st Congress of Writers of São Paulo, when he met several national literary figures, among them Aurélio Buarque de Holanda, Mário de Andrade and Monteiro Lobato. Returning to Goiânia, he founded the Brazilian Writers Association, of which he was elected president. In 1955, he published the poetry book First Rain.

In subsequent years, he dedicated himself to teaching and literature. He was co-founder, deputy director and professor at the Center for Brazilian Studies at the Federal University of Goiás. He then became a professor of Literature at the Catholic University of Goiás and in several preparatory courses for university entrance exams. In addition to collaborating with the cultural bodies that circulated in central Brazil, he participated in writers' congresses held in São Paulo, Belo Horizonte, Porto Alegre and Goiânia, promoted the 1st Congress of Literature in Goiás, in 1953, and held lectures, conferences and literary courses.

Between 1970 and 1978, he served as cultural advisor to the Representative Office of the State of Goiás, in Rio de Janeiro, and resumed his teaching position at the Federal University of Goiás. He also served as assistant director of the National Book Institute in Brasília from 1978 to 1985. In 1986, he was appointed to the Federal Council of Culture, to which he belonged until the organ's extinction, in 1989.

He received numerous literary awards: 
 José Lins do Rego Award (1965) and Jabuti Award (1966), for the book of stories Veranico de Janeiro 
 Prêmio Jabuti (1967) for his novel O Tronco
 Afonso Arinos Award, from the Brazilian Academy of Letters, for Caminhos e descaminhos 
 Sesquicentenário Independência Award, for the study Marechal Xavier Curado, criador do Exército Nacional (1972).

In 1987 he received the Fundação Cultural de Brasília Award, and the medal of the Institute of Arts and Culture of Brasília. He was the fourth occupant of Chair 1 at the Academia Brasileira, succeeding Ivan Lins in 1975.

References

Brazilian writers